The 2010 Walsh Cup is a hurling competition played by the teams of Leinster GAA, a team from Connacht GAA and a team from Ulster GAA.  The competition differs from the Leinster Senior Hurling Championship as it also features further education colleges from both Leinster and Connacht and the winning team does not progress to another tournament at All-Ireland level. The four losers of the preliminary round and the quarter finals enter the Walsh Shield.

Walsh Cup

Preliminary round

Quarter-finals

Semi-finals

Final

Walsh Shield
The Walsh Shield consists of the 8 losing teams from the preliminary round and the quarter finals of the Walsh Cup.

Quarter-finals

Semi-finals

Final

Walsh Cup
Walsh Cup (hurling)